Vitko is a surname. Notable people with the surname include:

Aleksandr Vitko (born 1961), Russian naval officer
Frantz Vitko, Belarusian trade unionist
Joe Vitko (born 1970), American baseball player
Marián Vitko (born 1994), Slovak volleyball player